Arrow is the fourth album by American folk band, Heartless Bastards. The album was released on February 15, 2012 through Partisan Records.

Track listing

Deluxe edition
The iTunes edition of the album contained a bonus track.

Personnel 
Erika Wennerstrom – guitar, vocals
Marc Nathan – guitar
Willie "Maceo 2" Rhodes – guitar
Billy White – bass
Doni Schroader – drums
Zy Orange Lyn – violin, mandolin

Chart performance

References 

2012 albums
Blues rock albums by American artists
Heartless Bastards albums